Union County is a county located in the U.S. state of Tennessee. As of the 2020 census, its population was 19,802. Its county seat is Maynardville. Union County is included in the Knoxville metropolitan statistical area.

History

Union County was formed in 1850 from portions of Grainger, Claiborne, Campbell, Anderson, and Knox Counties. At least two theories are given on the source of its name. The name may commemorate the "union" of sections of five counties, or it may reflect East Tennessee's support for the preservation of the Union in the years before and during the Civil War. The enabling legislation was initially passed January 3, 1850, but due to legal challenges and complications, the county was not formally created until January 23, 1856. The county seat was originally named "Liberty", but renamed "Maynardville" in honor of attorney and congressman Horace Maynard, who had defended the county in a court case that sought to block its formation.

In the 1930s, the damming of the Clinch River by the construction of Norris Dam by the Tennessee Valley Authority (TVA) to form Norris Lake inundated a large part of the county, including the community of Loyston, and displaced many residents. "The Move," what many displaced families called the forced relocation by TVA, would encounter criticism, as the promise of electrification of Union County would not come after the completion of Norris Dam, but two decades later in the mid-1950s. With assistance from the National Park Service and the Civilian Conservation Corps, the TVA developed Big Ridge State Park as a demonstration park on the shore of Norris Lake in Union County. The park's recreational facilities opened in May 1934.

Geography
The county is situated in the Ridge-and-Valley Appalachians, a range characterized by long, narrow ridges alternating with similarly shaped valleys. Prominent ridges in Union County include Copper Ridge, Hinds Ridge, and Lone Mountain. The southern end of Clinch Mountain forms part of the county's border with Grainger County to the east.

The Clinch River, Union County's primary stream, flows through the northern part of the county.  This section of the river is part of Norris Lake.  Big Ridge Dam, a small, nongenerating dam, impounds an inlet of Norris Lake, creating Big Ridge Lake at Big Ridge State Park.  The "Loyston Sea", one of the widest sections of Norris Lake, is located in Union County just north of the state park.

Adjacent counties
Claiborne County (north)
Grainger County (east)
Knox County (south)
Anderson County (southwest)
Campbell County (northwest)

State protected areas

Big Ridge State Park
Chuck Swan State Forest (part)

Demographics

2020 census

As of the 2020 United States census, there were 19,802 people, 7,405 households, and 5,471 families residing in the county.

2000 census
At the 2000 census, 17,808 people, 6,742 households and 5,191 families were residing in the county. The population density was 80 per square mile (31/km2). The 7,916 housing units averaged 35 per sq mi (14/km2).  The racial makeup of the county was 98.46% White, 0.10% African American, 0.23% Native American, 0.16% Asian,  0.19% from other races, and 0.86% from two or more races.  About 0.79% of the population were Hispanics or Latinos of any race.

Of the 6,742 households, 35.40% had children under the age of 18 living with them, 62.20% were married couples living together, 10.50% had a female householder with no husband present, and 23.00% were not families. About 19.80% of all households were made up of individuals, and 7.40% had someone living alone who was 65 years of age or older. The average household size was 2.62, and the average family size was 2.99.

The age distribution was 25.70% under 18, 8.90% from 18 to 24, 31.00% from 25 to 44, 23.60% from 45 to 64, and 10.80% who were 65  or older. The median age was 36 years. For every 100 females, there were 98.80 males. For every 100 females age 18 and over, there were 96.60 males.

The median household income was $27,335 and the median family income was $31,843. Males had a median income of $26,436 versus $18,665 for females. The per capita income for the county was $13,375. About 16.80% of families and 19.60% of the population were below the poverty line, including 25.10% of those under age 18 and 27.80% of those age 65 or over.

Economy

Top employers
According to a data profile produced by the Tennessee Department of Economic and Community Development in 2018, the top employers in the county are:

Education

 Big Ridge Elementary School
 Horace Maynard Middle School (previously Horace Maynard High School until 1997)
 Luttrell Elementary School
 Maynardville Elementary School
 Paulette Elementary School 
 Sharps Chapel Elementary School
Tennessee Virtual Academy
 Union County Alternative Center, grades 6-12
 Union County High School

Attractions

 Roy Acuff Museum 
 Big Ridge State Park

Communities

Cities
 Luttrell
 Maynardville (county seat)
 Plainview

Unincorporated communities
 Alder Springs
 Braden
 Sharps Chapel

Ghost town
 Loyston

Notable people
 Roy Acuff, entertainer
 Chet Atkins, entertainer
 Jake Butcher, former banker and politician, convicted of fraud
 Kenny Chesney, entertainer
 John Rice Irwin, historian and founder of Museum of Appalachia
 Florence Reece, who wrote the song "Which Side Are You On?", was born in Sharps Chapel in 1900.
 Carl Smith, entertainer

Government and politics

Union County's current mayor is Jason Bailey. The county has 17 commissioners, with two-to-three from each of its seven districts.

See also
 National Register of Historic Places listings in Tennessee#Union County

References

External links

 Official site
 Union County Chamber of Commerce
 Union County Public Schools
 TNGenWeb
 

 
Knoxville metropolitan area
Counties of Appalachia
1850 establishments in Tennessee
Populated places established in 1850
East Tennessee